Gmarket may refer to:

 G-Market, a South Korean online store owned by eBay
 G'market, a defunct supermarket chain in Romania